The 2015 Australian Open wildcard playoffs and entries are a group of events and internal selections to choose the eight men and eight women singles wildcard entries for the 2015 Australian Open, as well as seven male and seven female doubles teams plus eight mixed doubles teams.

One wildcard each was given to the winners of the Australian Open Wildcard Playoff, a tournament between Australian players who did not receive direct entry into the draw.

In an agreement with the United States Tennis Association and the French Tennis Federation, Tennis Australia gives one man and one woman from the United States and France each a wildcard into the Australian Open. The French players were chosen by internal selection, while 2014 USTA Pro Circuit's Australian Open Wild Card Challenge determined the two American players receiving wildcards.

Since the Australian Open is promoted as the "Grand Slam of Asia/Pacific", one male and one female player from this geographical area were awarded a wildcard. This was decided through the Asia-Pacific Australian Open Wildcard Playoff. At the same event, one male and one female doubles team won wildcards, and one wildcard each was contested in boys and girls singles.

Remaining wildcards were awarded by internal Australian selection.

Wildcard entries

Men's singles

Women's singles

Men's doubles

Women's doubles

Mixed doubles

Asia-Pacific Wildcard Playoff
The Asia-Pacific Wildcard Playoff events took place in Shenzhen, Guangdong, China from Monday, November 24 to Sunday, November 30, 2014. A total of 21 male and 32 female players from Asia/Pacific zone took part in singles events (including qualifying competitions), with Zhang Ze from China and Chang Kai-chen from Chinese Taipei gaining the Australian Open entry. Both doubles events consisted of 12 teams each, with Lee Hsin-han & Zhang Ze and Yang Zhaoxuan & Ye Qiuyu winning the wild cards. Junior playoff events were also held, and Chinese players Wu Yibing and Gao Xinyu won the wild card entries into the Boys' and Girls' main events, respectively.

Men's singles

Women's singles

Men's doubles

Women's doubles

Australian Wildcard Playoff
The Australian Wildcard Playoff events took place in Melbourne Park in Melbourne, Victoria, Australia from Monday, December 15 to Sunday, December 21, 2014. A total of 16 male and 16 female Australian players took part in singles events, with Jordan Thompson and Daria Gavrilova gaining the Australian Open entry. Mixed Doubles event was played in a Round robin format, where 11 teams competed in two groups. The top four mixed doubles teams then played in a knock-out tournament, where Sam Thompson and Masa Jovanovic won the wild card.

Men's singles

Women's singles

Mixed doubles

American Wildcard Challenge
The Australian Open Wild Card Challenge for male players consisted of:
 Charlottesville Men's Pro Challenger (27 October – 2 November, Charlottesville, Virginia),
 Knoxville Challenger (3 November – 9 November, Knoxville, Tennessee),
 JSM Challenger of Champaign–Urbana (10 November – 17 November, Champaign, Illinois).

The Australian Open Wild Card Challenge for female players consisted of:
 USTA Tennis Classic of Macon (20 October – 26 October, Macon, Georgia),
 John Newcombe Women's Pro Challenge (27 October – 2 November, New Braunfels, Texas),
 South Seas Island Resort Women's Pro Classic (3 November – 9 November, Captiva Island, Florida).

Denis Kudla and Irina Falconi who earned the most ATP World Tour or WTA ranking points at those selected USTA Pro Circuit events received wild cards to compete in the 2015 Australian Open main draw.

References